Sour Diesel is a hybrid strain of Cannabis sativa

In popular culture
Sour Diesel has appeared in works by Ryan David Jahn and Toby Rogers. The strain gave its name to two rap albums by Doap Nixon, as well as a single by Dame Grease. The Flatbush Zombies single "Face-Off", a rap song about recreational drug use, also mentions Sour Diesel at the start of its second verse: "Perfect day, 10 bitches, and some sour diesel." It is a favorite strain of rapper Wiz Khalifa. In season 3 episode 4 of the online TV show Broad City, Sour Diesel is featured as one of the cannabis-strains in possession of one of the two main characters.

See also
Cannabis strains
Medical cannabis

References

External links

Cannabis strains
Entheogens